Kamari is a small borough in Põltsamaa Parish, Jõgeva County in eastern Estonia.

There is Kamari Hydroelectric Power Station located on the Põltsamaa River. The station was launched in 1956. In 1956, the station was closed. The station was re-launched in 1999.

References

Populated places in Jõgeva County
Boroughs and small boroughs in Estonia